Starohnativka (Urum: Ґӱрджи) is a village in Volnovakha Raion (district) in Donetsk Oblast of eastern Ukraine, 65.9 km south from the centre of Donetsk city.

Demographics
Native language as of the Ukrainian Census of 2001:
Ukrainian 89.48%
 Russian 6.29%
Greek 0.05%

References

External links

Media coverage during the War in Donbas
 Ukraine reports heaviest shelling by eastern rebels since February, Reuters, 10 August 2015
 Jack Losh, Ukraine's Mystery Battle: Hunting for Truths Across an Elastic Border, Vice News, 17 August 2015
Villages in Volnovakha Raion